The water cycle, also known as the hydrologic cycle or the hydrological cycle, is a biogeochemical cycle that describes the continuous movement of water on, above and below the surface of the Earth. The mass of water on Earth remains fairly constant over time but the partitioning of the water into the major reservoirs of ice, fresh water, saline water (salt water) and atmospheric water is variable depending on a wide range of climatic variables. The water moves from one reservoir to another, such as from river to ocean, or from the ocean to the atmosphere, by the physical processes of evaporation, transpiration, condensation, precipitation, infiltration, surface runoff, and subsurface flow. In doing so, the water goes through different forms: liquid, solid (ice) and vapor. The ocean plays a key role in the water cycle as it is the source of 86% of global evaporation.

The water cycle involves the exchange of energy, which leads to temperature changes. When water evaporates, it takes up energy from its surroundings and cools the environment. When it condenses, it releases energy and warms the environment. These heat exchanges influence climate.

The evaporative phase of the cycle purifies water which then replenishes the land with freshwater. The flow of liquid water and ice transports minerals across the globe. It is also involved in reshaping the geological features of the Earth, through processes including erosion and sedimentation. The water cycle is also essential for the maintenance of most life and ecosystems on the planet.

Description

Overall process 

The water cycle is powered from the energy emitted by the sun. This energy heats water in the ocean and seas. Water evaporates as water vapor into the air. Some ice and snow sublimates directly into water vapor. Evapotranspiration is water transpired from plants and evaporated from the soil. The water molecule  has smaller molecular mass than the major components of the atmosphere, nitrogen and oxygen and hence is less dense. Due to the significant difference in density, buoyancy drives humid air higher. As altitude increases, air pressure decreases and the temperature drops (see Gas laws). The lower temperature causes water vapor to condense into tiny liquid water droplets which are heavier than the air, and which fall unless supported by an updraft. A huge concentration of these droplets over a large area in the atmosphere become visible as cloud, while condensation near ground level is referred to as fog.

Atmospheric circulation moves water vapor around the globe; cloud particles collide, grow, and fall out of the upper atmospheric layers as precipitation. Some precipitation falls as snow, hail, or sleet, and can accumulate in ice caps and glaciers, which can store frozen water for thousands of years. Most water falls as rain back into the ocean or onto land, where the water flows over the ground as surface runoff. A portion of this runoff enters rivers, with streamflow moving water towards the oceans. Runoff and water emerging from the ground (groundwater) may be stored as freshwater in lakes. Not all runoff flows into rivers; much of it soaks into the ground as infiltration. Some water infiltrates deep into the ground and replenishes aquifers, which can store freshwater for long periods of time. Some infiltration stays close to the land surface and can seep back into surface-water bodies (and the ocean) as groundwater discharge or be taken up by plants and transferred back to the atmosphere as water vapor by transpiration. Some groundwater finds openings in the land surface and emerges as freshwater springs. In river valleys and floodplains, there is often continuous water exchange between surface water and ground water in the hyporheic zone. Over time, the water returns to the ocean, to continue the water cycle.

The ocean plays a key role in the water cycle. The ocean holds "97% of the total water on the planet; 78% of global precipitation occurs over the ocean, and it is the source of 86% of global evaporation".

Physical processes

The water cycle involves the following processes:
Advection The movement of water through the atmosphere. Without advection, water that evaporated over the oceans could not precipitate over land. Atmospheric rivers that move large volumes of water vapor over long distances are an example of advection.
Canopy interception The precipitation that is intercepted by plant foliage eventually evaporates back to the atmosphere rather than falling to the ground.
Condensation The transformation of water vapor to liquid water droplets in the air, creating clouds and fog.
Deposition This refers to changing of water vapor directly to ice.
Evaporation The transformation of water from liquid to gas phases as it moves from the ground or bodies of water into the overlying atmosphere. The source of energy for evaporation is primarily solar radiation. Evaporation often implicitly includes transpiration from plants, though together they are specifically referred to as evapotranspiration.
Infiltration The flow of water from the ground surface into the ground. Once infiltrated, the water becomes soil moisture or groundwater. A recent global study using water stable isotopes, however, shows that not all soil moisture is equally available for groundwater recharge or for plant transpiration.
Percolation Water flows vertically through the soil and rocks under the influence of gravity.
Precipitation Condensed water vapor that falls to the Earth's surface. Most precipitation occurs as rain, but also includes snow, hail, fog drip, graupel, and sleet. Approximately  of water falls as precipitation each year,  of it over the oceans. The rain on land contains  of water per year and a snowing only . 78% of global precipitation occurs over the ocean.
Runoff The variety of ways by which water moves across the land. This includes both surface runoff and channel runoff. As it flows, the water may seep into the ground, evaporate into the air, become stored in lakes or reservoirs, or be extracted for agricultural or other human uses.
Snow melt The runoff produced by melting snow.
Sublimation The state change directly from solid water (snow or ice) to water vapor by passing the liquid state.
Subsurface flow The flow of water underground, in the vadose zone and aquifers. Subsurface water may return to the surface (e.g. as a spring or by being pumped) or eventually seep into the oceans. Water returns to the land surface at lower elevation than where it infiltrated, under the force of gravity or gravity induced pressures. Groundwater tends to move slowly and is replenished slowly, so it can remain in aquifers for thousands of years.
Transpiration The release of water vapor from plants and soil into the air.

Residence times 

The residence time of a reservoir within the hydrologic cycle is the average time a water molecule will spend in that reservoir (see adjacent table). It is a measure of the average age of the water in that reservoir.

Groundwater can spend over 10,000 years beneath Earth's surface before leaving. Particularly old groundwater is called fossil water. Water stored in the soil remains there very briefly, because it is spread thinly across the Earth, and is readily lost by evaporation, transpiration, stream flow, or groundwater recharge. After evaporating, the residence time in the atmosphere is about 9 days before condensing and falling to the Earth as precipitation.

The major ice sheets – Antarctica and Greenland – store ice for very long periods. Ice from Antarctica has been reliably dated to 800,000 years before present, though the average residence time is shorter.

In hydrology, residence times can be estimated in two ways. The more common method relies on the principle of conservation of mass (water balance) and assumes the amount of water in a given reservoir is roughly constant. With this method, residence times are estimated by dividing the volume of the reservoir by the rate by which water either enters or exits the reservoir. Conceptually, this is equivalent to timing how long it would take the reservoir to become filled from empty if no water were to leave (or how long it would take the reservoir to empty from full if no water were to enter).

An alternative method to estimate residence times, which is gaining in popularity for dating groundwater, is the use of isotopic techniques. This is done in the subfield of isotope hydrology.

Water in storage 

The water cycle describes the processes that drive the movement of water throughout the hydrosphere. However, much more water is "in storage" for long periods of time than is actually moving through the cycle. The storehouses for the vast majority of all water on Earth are the oceans. It is estimated that of the 1,386,000,000 km3 of the world's water supply, about 1,338,000,000 km3 is stored in oceans, or about 97%. It is also estimated that the oceans supply about 90% of the evaporated water that goes into the water cycle. The Earth's ice caps, glaciers, and permanent snowpack stores another 24,064,000 km3 accounting for only 1.7% of the planet's total water volume. However, this quantity of water is 68.7% of all freshwater on the planet.

Changes caused by humans

Water cycle intensification due to climate change 

Since the middle of the 20th century, human-caused climate change has resulted in observable changes in the global water cycle. The IPCC Sixth Assessment Report in 2021 predicted that these changes will continue to grow significantly at the global and regional level. These findings are a continuation of scientific consensus expressed in the IPCC Fifth Assessment Report from 2007 and other special reports by the Intergovernmental Panel on Climate Change which had already stated that the water cycle will continue to "intensify" throughout the 21st century.

Glacial retreat is also an example of a changing water cycle, where the supply of water to glaciers from precipitation cannot keep up with the loss of water from melting and sublimation. Glacial retreat since 1850 due to global warming has been extensive.

Changes due to other human activities 

Human activities, other than those that lead to global warming from greenhouse gas emissions, can also alter the water cycle. The IPCC Sixth Assessment Report stated that there is "abundant evidence that changes in land use and land cover alter the water cycle globally, regionally and locally, by changing precipitation, evaporation, flooding, groundwater, and the availability of freshwater for a variety of uses".

Examples for such land use changes are converting fields to urban areas or clearing forests. Such changes can affect the ability of soils to soak up surface water. Deforestation can also "directly reduce soil moisture, evaporation and rainfall locally but can also cause regional temperature changes that affect rainfall patterns". Aquifer drawdown or overdrafting and the pumping of fossil water increases the total amount of water in the hydrosphere because water that was "previously in the ground is now in direct contact with the atmosphere, being available for evaporation".

Related processes

Biogeochemical cycling 
While the water cycle is itself a biogeochemical cycle, flow of water over and beneath the Earth is a key component of the cycling of other biogeochemicals. Runoff is responsible for almost all of the transport of eroded sediment and phosphorus from land to waterbodies. The salinity of the oceans is derived from erosion and transport of dissolved salts from the land. Cultural eutrophication of lakes is primarily due to phosphorus, applied in excess to agricultural fields in fertilizers, and then transported overland and down rivers. Both runoff and groundwater flow play significant roles in transporting nitrogen from the land to waterbodies. The dead zone at the outlet of the Mississippi River is a consequence of nitrates from fertilizer being carried off agricultural fields and funnelled down the river system to the Gulf of Mexico. Runoff also plays a part in the carbon cycle, again through the transport of eroded rock and soil.

Slow loss over geologic time 

The hydrodynamic wind within the upper portion of a planet's atmosphere allows light chemical elements such as Hydrogen to move up to the exobase, the lower limit of the exosphere, where the gases can then reach escape velocity, entering outer space without impacting other particles of gas. This type of gas loss from a planet into space is known as planetary wind. Planets with hot lower atmospheres could result in humid upper atmospheres that accelerate the loss of hydrogen.

Historical interpretations

Floating land mass
In ancient times, it was widely thought that the land mass floated on a body of water, and that most of the water in rivers has its origin under the earth. Examples of this belief can be found in the works of Homer (circa 800 BCE).

Hebrew Bible 
In the ancient Near East, Hebrew scholars observed that even though the rivers ran into the sea, the sea never became full. Some scholars conclude that the water cycle was described completely during this time in this passage: "The wind goeth toward the south, and turneth about unto the north; it whirleth about continually, and the wind returneth again according to its circuits. All the rivers run into the sea, yet the sea is not full; unto the place from whence the rivers come, thither they return again" (Ecclesiastes 1:6-7). Scholars are not in agreement as to the date of Ecclesiastes, though most scholars point to a date during the time of King Solomon, son of David and Bathsheba, "three thousand years ago, there is some agreement that the time period is 962–922 BCE. Furthermore, it was also observed that when the clouds were full, they emptied rain on the earth (Ecclesiastes 11:3). In addition, during 793–740 BCE a Hebrew prophet, Amos, stated that water comes from the sea and is poured out on the earth (Amos 5:8).

In the Biblical Book of Job, dated between 7th and 2nd centuries BCE, there is a description of precipitation in the hydrologic cycle, "For he maketh small the drops of water: they pour down rain according to the vapour thereof; which the clouds do drop and distil upon man abundantly" (Job 36:27-28).

Understanding of precipitation and percolation
In the Adityahridayam (a devotional hymn to the Sun God) of Ramayana, a Hindu epic dated to the 4th century BCE, it is mentioned in the 22nd verse that the Sun heats up water and sends it down as rain. By roughly 500 BCE, Greek scholars were speculating that much of the water in rivers can be attributed to rain. The origin of rain was also known by then. These scholars maintained the belief, however, that water rising up through the earth contributed a great deal to rivers. Examples of this thinking included Anaximander (570 BCE) (who also speculated about the evolution of land animals from fish) and Xenophanes of Colophon (530 BCE). Chinese scholars such as Chi Ni Tzu (320 BCE) and Lu Shih Ch'un Ch'iu (239 BCE) had similar thoughts.

The idea that the water cycle is a closed cycle can be found in the works of Anaxagoras of Clazomenae (460 BCE) and Diogenes of Apollonia (460 BCE). Both Plato (390 BCE) and Aristotle (350 BCE) speculated about percolation as part of the water cycle. Aristotle correctly hypothesized that the sun played a role in the Earth's hydraulic cycle in his book Meteorology, writing "By it [the sun's] agency the finest and sweetest water is everyday carried up and is dissolved into vapor and rises to the upper regions, where it is condensed again by the cold and so returns to the earth.", and believed that clouds were composed of cooled and condensed water vapor.

Up to the time of the Renaissance, it was wrongly assumed that precipitation alone was insufficient to feed rivers, for a complete water cycle, and that underground water pushing upwards from the oceans were the main contributors to river water. Bartholomew of England held this view (1240 CE), as did Leonardo da Vinci (1500 CE) and Athanasius Kircher (1644 CE).

Discovery of the correct theory 
The first published thinker to assert that rainfall alone was sufficient for the maintenance of rivers was Bernard Palissy (1580 CE), who is often credited as the "discoverer" of the modern theory of the water cycle. Palissy's theories were not tested scientifically until 1674, in a study commonly attributed to Pierre Perrault. Even then, these beliefs were not accepted in mainstream science until the early nineteenth century.

See also

 
 
 
 
 
 
 
 
 Biotic pump

References

External links

 The Water Cycle, United States Geological Survey
 The Water Cycle for Kids, United States Geological Survey
 The Water Cycle: Following The Water (NASA Visualization Explorer with videos)

Biogeochemical cycle
Forms of water
Hydrology
Soil physics
Water
Articles containing video clips
Limnology
Oceanography